Zehra Bilir (March 26, 1913 in Arapgir, Ottoman Empire – June 28, 2007 in Istanbul, Turkey) was a renowned Turkish folk singer of Armenian descent. She was known as the Edith Piaf of Turkey.

Life 
Zehra Bilir was born Eliz Surhantakyan in Arapgir. In an article published in the Armenian newspaper Agos, it was suggested that Zehra Bilir's real Armenian name was Eliza Ölçüyan. Her father Harutyun, went to fight for the Ottoman Empire during the First World War but has never returned. Eliz had two sisters and a brother who her mother couldn't look after on her own. Therefore, her mother married a Turkish man and Eliz always believed that the Turkish man was in fact her real father. Her Turkish father gave her the name Zehra which she believed was her real name during her adolescence. But in an interview on Sabah (newspaper) she says that she changed her name when she was 22 while she married her second husband. This eventually became the name she is known by. After receiving her primary school education at the local elementary school, she and her family moves to Istanbul in 1927. After working alongside a hatter, she then begins to take musical notation and solfeggio lessons from famed Armenian musician Artaki Candan-Terzian.

She became one of the pioneers of the Gazino (night club) style. Westerners described her as the Edith Piaf of Turkey. She was one of the most famous singers of folk songs from Anatolia, often appearing in traditional garb and dancing with a handkerchief. One of the most popular entertainers, she appeared frequently on the Radio in Istanbul and Izmir.

Zehra Bilir died on June 28, 2007 at the age 94 years in a nursing home. She is buried in Zincirlikuyu Cemetery.

References 

Turkish people of Armenian descent
Ethnic Armenian women singers
People from Arapgir
1913 births
2007 deaths
Turkish folk singers
Ethnic Armenian Muslims
20th-century Turkish women singers